Artur Yurievich Gavrus (born 3 January 1994) is a Belarusian ice hockey player. He is currently playing for HC Dinamo Saint Petersburg of the Supreme Hockey League (VHL). He formerly played with HC Dinamo Minsk of the Kontinental Hockey League (KHL). He was selected by the New Jersey Devils in the 6th round (180th overall) of the 2012 NHL Entry Draft. He previously played for the Owen Sound Attack of the Ontario Hockey League, a major junior league in Canada.

Gavrus competed in the 2013 IIHF World Championship as a member of the Belarus men's national ice hockey team.

References

External links

1994 births
Living people
Sportspeople from Minsk Region
Belarusian ice hockey forwards
HC Dinamo Minsk players
HK Neman Grodno players
New Jersey Devils draft picks
Owen Sound Attack players